Billie Jean King defeated Rosalyn Fairbank in the final 6–2, 6–1 to win the inaugural Edgbaston Cup.

Seeds
The top eight seeds receive a bye into the second round.

  Tracy Austin (third round, retired)
  Sylvia Hanika (second round)
  Barbara Potter (second round)
  Billie Jean King (Champion)
  Sue Barker (third round)
  Kathy Jordan (third round)
  Betsy Nagelsen (semifinals)
  Ann Kiyomura (semifinals)
  Leslie Allen (quarterfinals)
  Jo Durie (quarterfinals)
  Yvonne Vermaak (third round)
  Wendy White (second round)
  Sharon Walsh (first round)
  Evonne Cawley (first round)

Qualifying

Draw

Finals

Top half

Section 1

Section 2

Bottom half

Section 3

Section 4

References

External links
 1982 Edgbaston Cup draws
 ITF tournament edition details
 ITF singles results page

Edgbaston Cup - Singles
Singles